Hurt Park may refer to:

Hurt Park (Atlanta), a public park in Atlanta
Hurt Park, Roanoke, Virginia, a neighborhood in Roanoke, Virginia